Momčilo Rašo (born 6 February 1997) is a Montenegrin professional footballer who plays as a centre back.

Club career 
Born in Kotor, Rašo began his career in FK Igalo in 2007, playing for them until 2014 before moving to Czech side FK Ústí nad Labem. After one season in FK Ústí nad Labem, he played for FK Dečić and FK Rabotnički.

In June 2018, Rašo joined Cypriot club AEL Limassol  on a three-year contract.

In January 2019, Rašo was loaned out to Latvian club FK Jelgava for the six months.

International career 
He has been a regular member of Montenegrin U-19 and U-21 national teams.

Honours 
AEL Limassol

 Cypriot Cup: 2018–19

References

External links 

 
 

1997 births
Living people
People from Kotor
Association football central defenders
Montenegrin footballers
Montenegro youth international footballers
Montenegro under-21 international footballers
FK Igalo 1929 players
FK Ústí nad Labem players
FK Dečić players
FK Rabotnički players
AEL Limassol players
FK Jelgava players
Montenegrin Second League players
Czech National Football League players
Montenegrin First League players
Macedonian First Football League players
Cypriot First Division players
Latvian Higher League players
Montenegrin expatriate footballers
Expatriate footballers in the Czech Republic
Montenegrin expatriate sportspeople in the Czech Republic
Expatriate footballers in North Macedonia
Montenegrin expatriate sportspeople in North Macedonia
Expatriate footballers in Cyprus
Montenegrin expatriate sportspeople in Cyprus
Expatriate footballers in Latvia
Montenegrin expatriate sportspeople in Latvia